The Zastava M70 is a 7.62x39mm assault rifle. Developed in Yugoslavia by Zastava Arms during the 1960s, the M70 was an unlicensed derivative of the Soviet AK-47 (specifically the Type 3 variant). It became the standard issue infantry weapon in the Yugoslav People's Army in 1970, complementing and later superseding the Zastava M59/66. Both the original M70 design, as well as commercial variants of the weapon without select-fire capability, known as the Zastava PAP series, are still produced by Zastava for export.

History

Beginning in 1952, Yugoslavia's defense industry had been experimenting with new automatic rifle designs, mostly patterned after the German StG 44, an unknown quantity of which had been captured by Yugoslav Partisans during World War II. In 1959, two Albanian soldiers defected to Yugoslavia with Soviet AK-47s, which were promptly passed on by the Yugoslav government to be inspected by Zastava engineers. Zastava was able to make metal castings of the two sample AKs, but could not glean enough technical data to reproduce the weapons or their associated parts. By the end of the year, however, the Yugoslav government had obtained more early pattern AKs from an unidentified Third World nation that was receiving Soviet military aid. At this point, there were enough AKs in Zastava's possession for its engineers to study and effectively reverse engineer the weapon type. Unlicensed production of an AK-47 derivative commenced in 1964.

The first domestic Kalashnikov rifles submitted by Zastava for military field trials were designated M64 and incorporated a milled receiver based heavily on that of the AK Type 3 but with several cosmetic differences. For example, while the right side of the receiver was almost indistinguishable from that of the AK-47, the left side of the receiver had a raised step. The M64 had a threaded barrel which resembled that of the AK-47 but was slightly thicker and not chrome-lined like its Soviet counterpart. It was also equipped with a ladder sight for launching rifle grenades, which was folded against the upper handguard when not in use. The sight functioned as a gas shutoff to enable the safe launching of a grenade when locked into place. This design would later be incorporated into Zastava's M59/66 derivative of the Soviet SKS carbine. As the recoil from the rifle grenade could dislodge the standard AK dust cover, this was replaced with a new design that utilized a spring-loaded bolt. The stock of the M64 was also fitted with a heavy rubber recoil pad to help absorb the recoil. The M64 was fed from modified AK-pattern magazines and was manufactured with a device that left the bolt open after the last round in the magazine had been fired. It also possessed longer handguards that were not interchangeable with the Soviet type. The placement of the AK-47's rear sight was moved even further to the rear, giving the operator a longer sight radius.

Though performances during field trials were satisfactory, the Yugoslav People's Army did not adopt the M64 in large numbers.
 

In 1970, the Yugoslav government approved the M64 for serial production as the AP M70 (Automatska Puška Model 1970, "Automatic Rifle Model 1970"), with a few alterations to the original design. To reduce production costs, the M64's bolt open device was removed. Instead, Zastava manufactured proprietary magazines for the M70 which fulfilled the same function. The magazines' follower plates had flat rear edges which held back the bolt after the last round was fired. A derivative of the M70 with a folding stock was also produced, under the designation M70A. The M70 became a standard infantry weapon in the Yugoslav People's Army that year.

Shortly afterwards, Zastava ceased threading the barrels of M70s into their receivers and adopted the cheaper and easier method of pressing and pinning barrels into the receivers. The M70s produced with pressed and pinned barrels, along with other detail improvements, were redesignated M70B, with the folding stock variant being redesignated M70 AB.

By the mid 1970s, Zastava began manufacturing the M70 with a stamped rather than a milled receiver to reduce production costs. This was known as the M70B1. Derivatives of the M70B1 with folding stocks were designated M70AB2. Both the M70B1 and M70AB2 were fitted with night sights, which alternatively utilized tritium vials or were marked with luminescent paint, that could be raised or lowered as needed. Small numbers of M70B1s and M70AB2s were manufactured with mounting brackets for optics, these were designated M70B1N and M70AB2N, respectively.

The final variant of the M70 to be produced was the M70B2, which possessed a new stamped receiver thicker and heavier than those found on comparable stamped receiver Kalashnikov rifles such as the AKM. The M70B2 and most later models of the M70AB2 were also manufactured with sturdier barrel trunnions resembling those on the RPK light machine gun. The rifles now possessed distinct bulges on either side of their forward receivers, necessary to accommodate the larger RPK-pattern trunnions. The addition of the larger trunnions and thicker receivers was seen as a necessary measure to strengthen the rifle design and make it more suitable for launching grenades.

Features

The original M70 design was based on the early pattern Soviet AK-47 (specifically Type 3), which utilised a milled receiver. There are a number of cosmetic differences between the two receiver patterns, namely the smooth left side of the receiver, which lacks the machined section normally found on original Soviet Type 3 AKs and their derivatives. The M64/M70 dust covers were secured into place by a unique locking recoil spring guide, which prevents it from being dislodged while firing rifle grenades. Additionally, Zastava serial numbers were engraved just above the magazine well on milled receiver M64s and M70s rather than on the trunnion. Even after Zastava began producing the M70 with a stamped receiver, many of the weapon's features more closely resembled those of the Type 3 AK rather than the stamped receiver AKM.

Zastava began incorporating larger, RPK-pattern barrel trunnions in the M70 during the mid to late 1970s, which resulted in a distinctive bulge on the forward receiver beneath the rifle's bolt handle. Each M70B1 was marked on the left above the bulged trunnion with the Zastava brandmark, model number, year of production, and a serial number. There are three fire selector markings on the right side of the receiver: "U" ("Ukočeno", safety), "R" ("Rafalna", automatic fire), and "J" ("Jedinacna", semi-automatic fire).

The M70 included an integral folding ladder sight and a detachable grenade launcher spigot for launching rifle grenades. The sight is normally locked into a folded position atop the rifle's upper handguard. Prior to firing a rifle grenade, the sight is raised and locked in the vertical position, which closes off the gas port in the barrel and prevents the M70's action from being cycled while a grenade is being launched. The M70 was designed to fire the M60 rifle grenade, with either a high-explosive or shaped charge warhead. The sight markings on the left side of the ladder sight are graduated for high-explosive or anti-personnel rounds, while those on the right are graduated for targeting armored vehicles and other hard targets.

The M70 was issued with a late pattern AKM bayonet, copied from the original Soviet product, with a leather scabbard hanger. It was also issued with a unique Yugoslavian canvas sling, which was secured to the rifle by a flat steel hook. The hook design required a much broader sling swivel to be attached to the M70's gas block than was usual to other Kalashnikov rifles.

Variants
 

 M70 – milled receiver, fixed stock
 M70A – milled receiver, underfolding stock
 M70A1 – milled receiver, underfolding stock, mount for night or optical sights
 M70B1 – stamped receiver, fixed stock
 M70AB2 – stamped receiver, underfolding stock
 M70B1N – stamped receiver, fixed stock, mount for night or optical sights
 M70AB2N – stamped receiver, underfolding stock, mount for night or optical sights
 M70AB3 – stamped receiver, underfolding stock, rifle grenade sight removed and replaced with a BGP 40 mm underslung grenade launcher
 M70B3 – stamped receiver, fixed stock, rifle grenade sight removed and replaced with a BGP 40 mm underslung grenade launcher
 M92 – carbine, the shorter variant of the M70AB2
 PAP M70 – semi-automatic variant intended for the civilian market
 Tabuk - Iraqi copy. Bore and chamber are not chrome plated.
 Tabuk Carbine - Iraqi carbine variant with underfolding stock
 Tabuk Sniper Rifle – Iraqi long barrel stamped receiver and fixed stock variant

Users

 
 
 : used by the Burkinabese contingent of the United Nations Multidimensional Integrated Stabilization Mission in Mali
 
 : used by rebel groups, such as CNDP and FDLR
 
 
 

 : 1,000 rifles donated by Croatia in 2013
 
 
 
  
 
 : Donated by Croatia in 2022.
 : Purchased a number of M70s for training of Ukrainian soldiers.

Former users
 : used by mercenaries in 1997

See also
 List of assault rifles
 Zastava M21
 Zastava M90

References

Further reading

External links

 
 
 
 
 

 

7.62×39mm assault rifles
Kalashnikov derivatives
Zastava Arms
Assault rifles of Yugoslavia
Rifles of the Cold War
Infantry weapons of the Cold War
Weapons and ammunition introduced in 1970